Adam Sol is a Canadian-American poet.

Life
Adam Sol was born in New York and raised in New Fairfield, Connecticut. He graduated from Tufts University, from Indiana University with an M.F.A, and from the University of Cincinnati with a Ph.D.  He lives in Toronto with his wife Rabbi Yael Splansky and their three sons.

Work
Sol published his first book of poems, Jonah's Promise in 2000, with MidList Press.

His second collection, Crowd of Sounds, won the Trillium Prize for Poetry in 2004.

Publishing his third collection, Jeremiah Ohio, in 2008.  Complicity found popularity through the Poetry in Voice contest.  In which, Sol's poem "Opus 75, Sestina in B-flat for the Glockenspiel" is often read.  Brittany Huellas-Bruskiewicz's rendition won the contest in 2018.

Next, Sol put his teaching skills to work through his popular poetry blog "How a Poem Moves," in which, he breaks down the poetic works of other writers and directs and explains their meaning in a way more easily digestible to a less experienced reader of poems.  The best of this blog was later compiled into a 2019 book, recommended by CBC.

Sol's most recent book, Broken Dawn Blessings, brings a personal touch to his writing.  Writing from an autobiographical perspective, as a husband helping his wife through cancer. It was the 2022 winner of the Canadian Jewish Literary Award for Poetry. 

Sol also has an extensive professorial career, teaching at such institutions as Laurentian University, York University, and currently at the University of Toronto's Victoria College.

Awards
2004 Trillium Book Award for Poetry
2008 Trillium Book Award for Poetry, Shortlist
2022 Canadian Jewish Literary Award for Poetry

Works

Non-fiction

References

External links
Publisher's page on Adam Sol at Anansi.ca
"Adam Sol: A conversation ending with a poem", Lemon Hound, April 07, 2009
"Ten Questions (Trillium Finalists Series) with Adam Sol", Open Book Toronto
"Adam Sol", Northern Poetry Review, Dani Couture, September 2008
"The NaPoMo Questionnaire: Adam Sol", The NationalPost,  April 14, 2009

American emigrants to Canada
Year of birth missing (living people)
Living people
21st-century Canadian poets
Canadian male poets
Writers from New York (state)
Tufts University alumni
Indiana University alumni
University of Cincinnati alumni
Academic staff of York University
Academic staff of the University of Toronto Scarborough
Academic staff of Laurentian University
People from New Fairfield, Connecticut
21st-century Canadian male writers